Thomas Ackland Blundell (born 1 September 1990) is a New Zealand cricketer. He made his international debut for the New Zealand national cricket team in January 2017. He also plays first-class cricket for Wellington. In April 2019, he was named in New Zealand's One Day International (ODI) squad for the 2019 Cricket World Cup, despite being uncapped in an ODI match.

Background and domestic career
A scion of the ancient Lancashire gentry family, Blundell was educated at Wellington College, Wellington where he excelled at cricket. Named in New Zealand's squad for the 2010 Under-19 Cricket World Cup, playing in one game, Blundell made his first-class debut in 2013. In June 2018, he was awarded a contract with Wellington for the 2018–19 season. In November 2020, in the third round of the 2020–21 Plunket Shield season, Blundell was given out obstructing the field.

International career
In January 2017 he was added to New Zealand's Twenty20 International (T20I) squad as their wicket-keeper for their third match against Bangladesh, after Luke Ronchi was injured. On 8 January 2017 he made his T20I debut for New Zealand against Bangladesh.

In January 2017, he was added to New Zealand's One Day International (ODI) squad as their wicket-keeper against Australia, but he did not play. In November 2017, he was added to New Zealand's Test squad for their series against the West Indies. He made his Test debut for New Zealand against the West Indies on 1 December 2017. He replaced the injured BJ Watling as the wicket-keeper, scoring 107 not out which was the highest Test score by a New Zealand wicket-keeper on debut. He also became the first wicket-keeper since Matt Prior in 2007 to score a century on Test debut.

In April 2019, he was named in New Zealand's squad for the 2019 Cricket World Cup. The International Cricket Council (ICC) named him as one of the five surprise picks for the tournament. However, he did not play a match during the tournament. The following month, he was one of twenty players to be awarded a new contract for the 2019–20 season by New Zealand Cricket.

In January 2020, Blundell was named in New Zealand's One Day International (ODI) squad for their series against India. He made his ODI debut for New Zealand, against India, on 5 February 2020.

On 2 December 2020, he was named as wicket-keeper for the Test squad for their home series against West Indies, replacing BJ Watling, who suffered an injury.

References

External links
 

1990 births
Living people
New Zealand people of English descent
People educated at Wellington College (New Zealand)
Wellington cricketers
Cricketers from Wellington City
New Zealand cricketers
New Zealand Test cricketers
New Zealand One Day International cricketers
New Zealand Twenty20 International cricketers
Cricketers who made a century on Test debut
Cricketers at the 2019 Cricket World Cup
Wicket-keepers